Abazinsky District is an administrative and municipal district (raion), one of the ten in the Karachay-Cherkess Republic, Russia. It is located in the north of the republic. Its administrative center is the rural locality (an aul) of Inzhich-Chukun. As of the 2010 Census, the total population of the district was 17,069, with the population of Inzhich-Chukun accounting for 15.2% of that number.

History
The district was established in 2006.

Administrative and municipal status
Within the framework of administrative divisions, Abazinsky District is one of the ten in the Karachay-Cherkess Republic and has administrative jurisdiction over all of its five rural localities. As a municipal division, the district is incorporated as Abazinsky Municipal District. Its five rural localities are incorporated into five rural settlements within the municipal district. The aul of Inzhich-Chukun serves as the administrative center of both the administrative and municipal district.

References

Notes

Sources

Districts of Karachay-Cherkessia